Davie Park (born ) was a Scottish professional golfer who played during the mid-to-late 19th century. Park had five top-10 finishes in The Open Championship. His best performance came in 1866 Open Championship when he placed second.

Early life
David Park was born in Scotland circa 1840.

Golf career
In addition to his on-the-course skills as a player, Park was also an excellent club maker. He had as an apprentice Peter Paxton who would go on to be a fine player as well as a club and ball maker.

1866 Open Championship
Park's best chance to win a major championship came when he played in the 1866 Open Championship held on 13 September at Prestwick Golf Club. Park finished two shots back, losing to his brother Willie Park, Sr. who won the Championship for the third time. There were 16 competitors in the tournament.

Details of play
Playing in a strong wind, Willie Park was in the first group out and was the pacesetter with a score of 54. Defending champion Andrew Strath and Davie Park were four behind, scoring 58. Willie Park extended his lead to five stokes after the second round. Despite a final round of 59, Willie Park set a useful target of 169. Davie Park's final round of 56 gave him a total of 171 and second place. Robert Andrew was third, a further five strokes behind.

Death
Park's date of death is unknown.

Results in The Open Championship

Note: Park played only in The Open Championship.

NT = No tournament
DNP = Did not play
"T" indicates a tie for a place
Yellow background for top-10

References

Scottish male golfers
19th-century Scottish people
19th-century sportsmen
Year of birth uncertain
Year of death unknown